Mahyar (Persian مهیار) is a Persian name and may refer to:

Mahyar, Isfahan, Iran
Mahyar, South Khorasan, Iran
Mahyar Rural District, in Iran
Mahyar Alizadeh (born 1982), Persian musician

See also